The beautiful demoiselle (Calopteryx virgo) is a species of damselfly in the family Calopterygidae. It is found in Europe, North Africa, and Western Asia. It is often found along fast-flowing waters where it is most at home.

Subspecies
Subspecies include:
Calopteryx virgo britannica Conci, 1952
Calopteryx virgo festiva (Brullé, 1832)  (eastern Mediterranean) 
Calopteryx virgo meridionalis Sélys, 1853 (western Mediterranean and south-west France) 
Calopteryx virgo padana Conci, 1956 (northern Italy) 
Calopteryx virgo virgo (Linnaeus, 1758)

Description

Eggs and larvae
Females lay up to 300 eggs at a time on emergent or floating plants, often on water-crowfoot. Like the banded demoiselle, they often submerge to do so. The eggs hatch after around 14 days. Again, like the banded demoiselle, the larvae are stick-like with long legs and develop over a period of two years in submerged vegetation, plant debris or roots. They usually overwinter in mud or slime.

The larvae of the beautiful demoiselle develop over 10 to 12 stages, each of which takes place between a molt. The body length is variable and highly dependent on environmental conditions. The final stage (F-0-stage) larvae are 3.5 to 4.6 millimeters and weigh about 4 milligrams, slightly below the banded demoiselle. Apart from the larvae of the demoiselles are difficult to distinguish from each other, the apparent differences lie mainly in the bristles and the severity of the tracheal gills on their abdomen. Compared to other damselflies demoiselles larvae fall immediately on the other hand, due to their much shorter mean gill lamella.

The body of the larvae shows only a relatively small adjustment to the fast-flowing waters of their habitat. The body is not flattened but very slim and turning around, the legs are long and have its end with strong claws, with which it can be stated in the vegetation. Because they reside within the water body, but mainly in the quieter areas, the danger of being swept with the flow, is relatively low. If this happens, they clearly its long body and legs stretched as far as possible to get in touch with the vegetation or the substrate to come.

Adult

These large, dark damselflies have small hemispherical eyes located laterally on the head, two pairs of wings similar in shape and a slender abdomen. The basal area of the wings is transparent, otherwise wings are uniformly colored. The wings are also traversed by a dense network of veins. This species presents an evident sexual dimorphism in colour pattern.

The male usually has much more extensive pigmentation on the wings than other Calopteryx species in its range: in the south east of its range (the Balkans and Turkey) the wings are entirely metallic blue while in other areas, there are clear areas at the base and tip of the wing. Immature males show brown wings, as the metallic blue wing color develops only with age.  They have metallic blue-green bodies and blue-green eyes.

The female has dark brown iridescent wings, a white patch near the tip of the wings (called a pseudopterostigma) and a metallic green body with a bronze tip of the abdomen.

This species is rather similar to the banded demoiselle (Calopteryx splendens), another British damselfly with coloured wings.

Distribution
The distribution of the beautiful demoiselle covers all of Europe with the exception of the southwestern Iberian Peninsula, the Balearic Islands and Iceland. In the north it extends to the Arctic polar sea, and thus much further north than that of the banded demoiselle. On the North African Mediterranean coast, its southern populations in Morocco and Algeria can be found.
The northern boundary in Asia following the 13-°C July isotherm, it is therefore not in the areas where the average temperature in summer below 13 °C falls, otherwise they are met with in temperate and cool regions in the entire continent with the exception of deserts and the mountains of. The eastern subspecies of C. v. japonica found on the Japanese islands is under debate as to whether it is a separate species.
The beautiful demoiselle is mostly found in lowland locations. Regular findings come from areas up to a maximum height of 980  m above sea level. Occasionally they may be found up to 1,200 meters in altitude, such as in the Alps.

Habitat

Biotope

The blue-winged demoiselle lives mainly near small to medium-sized streams and creeks. They prefer a relatively low water temperature and a moderate to fast flow. The water must not be nutrient rich (eutrophic). In the northern part of their range, such as in Norway and Finland, it is also found near medium-sized rivers or even larger streams. The waters are usually in the immediate vicinity of forests.

Larval habitat
The larvae live in the streams mentioned before and are mainly dependent on the water plants. The larvae need the stems and leaves, especially in areas with stronger currents to hold on. Hence it is extremely rare to find them in barren locations, flat expiring banks, or areas with a smooth stone floor. They also live in small natural lakes or ponds characteristic for limestones bedrock. They live in quieter areas between alluvial leaves or on exposed roots of the vegetation. They can be found on submerged plants such as waterweed (Elodea sp.), floods for water crowfoot (Ranunculus fluitans) or other plants, submerged from a few centimetres to several decimetres.
Compared with the larvae of the banded demoiselle the larvae of the blue-wing demoiselle prefer quieter areas of the water, since slower flow causes a more effective absorption of oxygen under water. Only in very rare cases the larvae are present in stagnant water. The substrate of the river has only a very minor importance, because the larvae reside mainly in the vegetation.
An important factor for the occurrence of blue-wing demoiselles is the oxygen in the water. The larvae is much more sensitive to oxygen deficiency  than the larvae of the banded demoiselle, hence it needs a sufficient oxygen saturation of the water. Waters with high levels of sediment and sludge, which is consumed by bacterial decomposition of oxygen are, accordingly not as a habitat for the larvae. This sensitivity qualifies it in water chemistry  as a bioindicator for the assessment of water quality. Thus they will be an indication of value in the saprobic assigned of 1.9, which represents a low to moderately polluted waters type (β-mesosaprob) and a water quality class from I to II does.
Another key factor for the occurrence of the larvae of the blue-wing demoiselle is the temperature of the water. This species prefers unlike the banded demoiselle, mainly the cooler and shadier areas of the water. The optimal temperature is a summer average 13 to 18 °C. At temperatures above 22 °C were often injuries of larvae observed and also a reduced hatch ability of eggs. The main reason is the oxygen content under higher temperatures. Individual populations may get used to permanently higher temperatures.

Adult habitat
The habitat that the adults occupy, corresponds to the nearby larval habitat. Unlike the adults of the banded demoiselle you meet those of the beautiful demoiselle but also in forest clearings, but very rarely on the banks of larger ponds. As resting places, the insects need trees and shrubs, often resting on high herbaceous plants such as the large nettle (Urtica dioica).
The breeding habitats are similar to the larval habitat, these are cool, shady water-courses largely with a more or less strong current and near-natural vegetation and bank structure. This is mostly meadow and pasture streams in the area, they rarely pass through the forest. A distinct riparian vegetation also plays a role as a windbreak. Due to their broad wings the beautiful demoiselle can be blown away by the wind more easily than other species of dragonflies.

Behaviour
Males are territorial, perching in bankside plants and trees, waiting for females  or chasing. They chase passing insects, often returning to the same perch. Males can stray well away from water, females live away from water unless egg-laying or seeking a mate.

As with the banded demoiselle is also in the blue wing-demoiselle a pronounced territorial behavior of sexually mature males. These days occupy territories that they defend against other males. The defense consists mostly in threatening gestures. For this they spread their wings and put them on display so clearly visible, there is also Drohflügen and in rare cases to air combat between rival males. Optimal areas correspond to the optimal nesting places for the females and are characterized by a normally increased flow and a suitable oviposition substrate in the potential breeding sites. The size of the spots and their distance apart is the density of the population dependent as well as the occurrences of the water and may be between several meters and a few decimetres. Males who do not occupy spots can keep themselves in the vegetation on the shore and try to mate with fly to females or to fill vacant spots. Especially when only a few males are present, the territorial defense is very aggressive, with a higher number of competing male aggression but decreases significantly.
The males sit in their areas mostly in exposed places in the vegetation, which extends over the water, sometimes on vegetation or rocks cushions amid the waters. This seat is waiting at the same time the center of the district they do their gaze primarily on the aquatic center and will show a behavior that is referred to as "wings lapping" and in which the wings beat quickly down and slowly lifted. It is believed that it is mainly used for communication, it also supports the ventilation in the thorax and accordingly probably also plays a role in thermoregulation of the animals

Mating and egg laying

Mating takes place in a way that for the genus Calopteryx and is typical of an eye-catching advertising behavior precedes. The females fly over the water, always in search of suitable nesting places and fly it through the territories of males. The males who recognize the females to the reflections of the moving wings, fly towards it, once they have crossed the border area. They use a striking Schwirrflug that only in the courtship will be shown, and demonstrate the underside of its abdomen raised high. The last three segments of it are much brighter and are referred to as a "lantern" that will be presented. The male leads in this way, the female to the nesting sites ("Show flight") and circled it on the water once it has settled out. Then in turn followed by a period of hovering flight and only if the female is sitting there and so his willingness to mate signaled it comes to mating. In return, the male is on the wings of the female and begins copulation, which can last between 40 seconds and 5 minutes, the animals themselves in the "mating wheel" can rely on the vegetation.

After mating, the male releases the female again and again shows this is the nesting place, the female abdomen with drooping sit for a few seconds ("post-copulatory rest") and then follows the male. The eggs are laid in the stems of aquatic plants in the water level and below, where the female can submerge up to 90 minutes. It climbs here (unlike almost all other species of dragonflies) upside down on the stem down and stabs the eggs with the egg-laying apparatus ( ovipositor ) almost vertically into the stems. During the nesting above the water surface while the female is the male defended against other males. Both sexes mate several times a day for several weeks until her death.

Larval development and life of larvae
The eggs, in which the embryos develop, are on average about 1.2 millimeters long and have a spindle-shaped structure with approximately 0.2 millimeters wide. At the pointed end are, as with other demoiselles also a hole structure ( Mikropylenapparat ) with four holes to enable penetration of the sperm of the male. In addition, the egg of the banded demoiselle at the front end a funnel-like appendix unknown object, which projects at the inserted egg outwardly from the plant stem. The color of the egg changes from a bright yellow when freshly laid eggs on a yellow-brown to reddish brown when older egg.
Within the egg takes place, the embryonic development of the dragonfly. For the first time this has been described for the blue-winged demoiselle 1869, but it represented the first description of the embryonic development of an insect at all. From outside the progression of the development by a slight change in length as well as by changing the shape is recognizable. It bulges on the upper part of the egg slightly, while the lower part deforms concave. The development itself can be divided into three sections:
•	the early development, when it forms after fertilization of the ovum by dividing the basic shape of body
•	definitely the development with the final formation of the body shape until they hatch from the egg
•	the larval development of the hatched larva up to the formation of the winged imago

The embryo in the egg can last between 20 days and one month.

The larval development of the Blue-winged demoiselle takes into Middle Eastern waters, usually between six and nine weeks, mainly due to the preference of cooler waters, it is usually somewhat longer than that of the banded demoiselle. At the end of larval development, it comes to winter and the development until the following year with the metamorphosis to the imago completed (univoltine development). The cooler water is a breeding, the greater the proportion of larvae that pass through the two winter periods and therefore a development of nearly two years (semivoltine development). Studies have shown that this might modify the relationship between univoltine and semivoltinen larvae within a body of water and clear in the course of the river and increase the water temperature moves toward univoltiner larvae.

Like all these predatory dragonfly larvae live. They feed primarily on insect larvae such as those of the black flies, midges, stoneflies and mayflies, as well as amphipods. They are defending their seats against other dragonfly larvae, especially those of its own kind.

The larvae are much more sensitive to changes in habitat than the banded demoiselle, especially to temperature fluctuations. Already after a few days deprivation increases mortality rapidly, and after again prevail acceptable oxygen conditions, it is still too long after, birth defects and an increased mortality rate among affected animals. This is mainly because they absorb the oxygen from the water inefficient. Was able to detect in experiments that even larvae of the banded demoiselle, who had been removed completely. The thin-skinned, tracheogenic body attachments for oxygen uptaking from the water, under normal circumstances are still less sensitive to fluctuations in the oxygen supply. The inefficiency of oxygen uptake is balanced by the choice of habitat, since both increased flow and cooler water absorption capacity.

Hatching 

The first adults of dragonflies emerge, depending on the weather, at the end of April to the end of September. The main hatching time lies in the days of late May to late June. The emergence, i.e. the transformation of the larvae to adults and the associated leaving the water, is not synchronous and lasts throughout the season until about mid-July. The newly hatched dragonflies spend after leaving the larval shell (exuvia ) is the first time until full coloration in the vegetation surrounding the water body. This aging period usually lasts about 10 days, after which they return to the waters. The adult animals live only one season, it was a lifetime determined from about 40 to 50 days.

Throughout the day there are males in sunlit waters are already in the early morning (in Central Europe between 7.00 and 9.00 o'clock), where they stay forever in the areas that are exposed directly. In the aquatic environment, shaded according to the animals appear later, usually basking in the tops of the surrounding vegetation. Females fly over during the day, the waters in search of suitable nesting sites, the main activity of both sexes such as hunting, advertising, mating and egg laying occurs in the warm midday hours. At night the animals as well as sit in the early morning sun-drenched coves in the vegetation at these sites, they also spend the night.
The radius of action and thus the distance between breeding, hunting and rest area is in the males of 20–100 meters and is therefore very small, the females were observed, however walking distances of up to four miles per day.

Conservation
The blue wing-demoiselle is stenoecious, due to their very narrow ecological requirements. Especially the larvae can only thrive in waters that are characterized by little human influence and natural water bodies. In the largest part of their range, the species is very rare. It is absent in areas corresponding to major cities or industrial centers completely, and even in regions with strongly pronounced agricultural use it is to be found only rarely. According to this situation it is in Germany in the Red Data Book (1998) classified as endangered in some states it is even in danger of extinction. Similarly in Austria, Switzerland and other Central European countries.

Among the factors that make a settlement of the water for the larvae of the blue-wing demoiselle impossible to include on the one hand, the channeling and obstruction of the same, go where the lost for the settlement of important aquatic plants. On the other hand, the eutrophication of water by agriculture and by household wastewater causes an important factor in the decline dar. this to increased sludge formation and therefore increased oxygen consumption in the affected waters and to increased algal growth of so-called " slime algae ". It is brown and green algae, the water plant and the substrate is overgrown. The veralgten plants are not accepted by the females as oviposition sites. In addition, the larvae no holding facilities are against the current, and the algae and dirt particles settle to the gill lamellae are important for respiration. The algae is followed by weeds and ultimately a silting of water bodies.

But natural waters with low water pollution can be in a state of the animals is not available. He may receive a water surface is not completely from the plants of the marginal vegetation to be overgrown, this is done mainly by fast-growing plants such as meadowsweet (Filipendula ulmaria), the stinging nettle (Urtica dioica) or Himalayan balsam (Impatiens glandulifera). The tree growth on the waters edge should not report closed canopy, otherwise lack the necessary sunlight.
Above all streams in uncultivated pastures, where no regular mowing is taking place, according to the animals are not habitable. This can be countered by regular removal of boundary vegetation, which will also not be complete. Even a partial thinning of trees and shrubs should be performed. In intensively used agricultural areas with a regular input of manure as fertilizer is a few meters wide can prevent extensive or unmanaged riparian strips one Einschwemmung and thus act against eutrophication.

See also
 List of British dragonflies

Bibliography
 Georg Rüppell: . The Demoiselles Europe The New Brehm library . Westarp Sciences, Hohenwarsleben 2005,  .
 Gerhard Jurzitza: . the cosmos-dragonfly leader Franckh Kosmos Verlag GmbH & Co., Stuttgart 2000,  .
 Heiko Bellmann: . watching dragonflies - determine nature Verlag, Augsburg, 1993,  .
 K. D. B. Dijkstra, illustrations: R. Lewington, Guide des libellules de France et d'Europe, Delachaux et Niestlé, Paris, 2007,.
 Klaus Sternberg, Rainer Buchenwald . Dragonflies Baden-Württemberg, Volume 1 Eugen Ulmer Verlag, Stuttgart 2000,  .

References

External links
 Schorr, M. and Paulson, D. 2015. World Odonata List. Tacoma, Washington, USA
 

Calopterygidae
Odonata of Africa
Odonata of Asia
Damselflies of Europe
Insects of the Arctic
Damselflies described in 1758
Taxa named by Carl Linnaeus